Cedric Manhoef (born 19 April 1993) is a Surinamese professional kickboxer and K-1 and SUPERKOMBAT fighter, where he held the SUPERKOMBAT New Heroes Middleweight Championship. He is trained by his older cousin Melvin Manhoef who inspired him to pursue his career.

As of 12 March 2018, he is ranked the #7 lightweight in the world by LiverKick.com.

Championships

Kickboxing
Kunlun Fight
2016 Kunlun Fight World Max Group K Tournament Winner
World Fighting League
2015 WFL -70 kg Tournament Champion
SUPERKOMBAT Fighting Championship
SUPERKOMBAT New Heroes Middleweight Championship -71 kg/156.5 lb (One time)

Kickboxing record

|-  style="background:#fbb;"
| 2019-03-09 || Loss ||align=left| Johan Tkac || Fight Stadium 4, Semi Finals  || France  ||Decision (Unanimous) || 4 || 3:00
|-  style="background:#cfc;"
| 2018-09-22 || Win ||align=left| Lofogo Sarour || World Fighting League, Final 16 || Almere, Netherlands || TKO (three knockdown rule) || 3 || N/A 
|-  style="background:#fbb;"
| 2017-11-25 || Loss ||align=left| Chingiz Allazov || Nuit Des Champions 2017 || Marseille, France  ||Decision (Unanimous) || 5 || 3:00
|-
! style=background:white colspan=9 |  
|-  style="background:#fbb;"
| 2017-07-15 || Loss ||align=left| Jomthong Chuwattana || Kunlun Fight 64 || chongqing, China || Ex.R Decision (Unanimous) || 4 || 3:00
|-  style="background:#fbb;"
| 2017-05-14 || Loss ||align=left| Yodsanklai Fairtex || Kunlun Fight 61 - World Max 2017 Group H Tournament Semi Finals || Sanya, China || Decision (Unanimous) || 3 || 3:00
|-  style="background:#fbb;"
| 2017-01-01 || Loss ||align=left| Superbon Banchamek || Kunlun Fight 56 - World Max Tournament 2016, Semi Finals || Sanya, China || Decision (Unanimous) || 3 || 3:00 
|-  style="background:#cfc;"
| 2016-10-30 || Win ||align=left| Wu Xuesong || Kunlun Fight 54 - World MAX Tournament 2016 Final 8 || Hubei, China || Decision (Unanimous) || 3 || 3:00 
|-
! style=background:white colspan=9 |
|-  style="background:#cfc;"
| 2016-08-20 || Win ||align=left| Kong Lingfeng || Kunlun Fight 50 – World MAX Tournament 2016 Final 16 || Jinan, China || Decision (unanimous) || 3 || 3:00  
|-
! style=background:white colspan=9 |
|-  style="background:#cfc;"
| 2016-05-14|| Win ||align=left| Clayton Henriques || Kunlun Fight 44 – World MAX 2016 Group K Tournament, Final || Khabarovsk, Russia || Decision (Unanimous) || 3 || 3:00   
|-
! style=background:white colspan=9 |
|-  style="background:#cfc;"
| 2016-05-14 || Win ||align=left| Christopher Mena || Kunlun Fight 44 – World MAX 2016 Group K Tournament, Semi Finals || Khabarovsk, Russia || Decision (Unanimous) || 3 || 3:00  
|-  style="background:#fbb;"
| 2016-04-23 || Loss ||align=left| Vlad Tuinov || W5 Grand Prix "KITEK" || Moscow, Russia || Decision (unanimous) || 3 || 3:00  
|-  style="background:#fbb;"
| 2016-02-26 || Loss ||align=left| Jo Nattawut || Lion Fight XXVIII || Mashantucket Pequot, Connecticut, USA || Decision (unanimous) || 3 || 3:00  
|-
! style=background:white colspan=9 |
|-  style="background:#cfc;"
| 2015-12-05 || Win ||align=left| Faton Vukshinaj || Mix Fight Gala, Final || Frankfurt, Germany || Decision || 3 || 3:00  
|- 
! style=background:white colspan=9 |
|-  style="background:#cfc;"
| 2015-12-05 || Win ||align=left| Lirim Ahmeti || Mix Fight Gala, Semi Finals || Frankfurt, Germany || Decision || 3 || 3:00  
|-  style="background:#cfc;"
| 2015-10-18|| Win ||align=left| Massaro Glunder || WFL "Unfinished Business", 70 kg 4 Man Tournament, Final || Hoofddorp, Netherlands ||  Decision || 3 || 3:00  
|-
! style=background:white colspan=9 |
|-  style="background:#cfc;"
| 2015-10-18|| Win ||align=left| Edson Fortes || WFL "Unfinished Business", 70 kg 4 Man Tournament, Semi Finals || Hoofddorp, Netherlands ||  Decision || 3 || 3:00 
|-  style="background:#fbb;"
| 2015-05-16 || Loss ||align=left| Nordin Ben Moh || A1 WCC Platinum || Eindhoven, Netherlands || Decision (split) || 3 || 3:00  
|-  style="background:#cfc;"
| 2015-04-12 || Win ||align=left| Mohammed El Messaoudi || World Fighting League || Hoofddorp, Netherlands ||  Decision || 3 || 3:00 
|-  style="background:#cfc;"
| 2014-10-04 || Win ||align=left| Redouane Derras || Mix Fight Gala XVI - Tournament, Final || Fulda, Germany || KO || 1 || 
|-  style="background:#cfc;"
| 2014-10-04 || Win ||align=left| Danijel Solaja || Mix Fight Gala XVI - Tournament, Semi Final || Fulda, Germany || Decision (unanimous) || 3 || 3:00 
|-  style="background:#fbb;"
| 2014-05-17 || Loss ||align=left| Cenk Cankutaranoglu || A1 World Combat Cup, Final 16 || Eindhoven, Netherlands || Ext R. Decision || 4 || 3:00  
|-  style="background:#c5d2ea;"
| 2014-03-29 || Draw ||align=left| Amansio Paraschiv || SUPERKOMBAT New Heroes 7 || Ploiești, Romania || Draw (majority) || 3 || 3:00 
|-
! style=background:white colspan=9 |
|-  style="background:#cfc;"
| 2014-02-23 || Win ||align=left| Ismat Agazade || K-1 World MAX 2013 World Championship Tournament Final 4, Super Fight || Baku, Azerbaijan || Decision (unanimous) || 3 || 3:00 
|-  style="background:#cfc;"
| 2013-12-01 || Win ||align=left| Brahim Kallah || Fight Fans VII || Amsterdam, Netherlands || Decision (unanimous) || 3 || 3:00  
|-  style="background:#cfc;"
| 2013-11-03 || Win ||align=left| Cristian Milea || SUPERKOMBAT New Heroes 6 || Carrara, Italy || Decision (Split) || 3 || 3:00  
|-
! style=background:white colspan=9 |
|-  style="background:#cfc;"
| 2013-10-05 || Win ||align=left| Nader Farhou || Fight Fans VI || Amsterdam, Netherlands || Decision (unanimous) || 3 || 3:00  
|-  style="background:#cfc;"
| 2013-08-31 || Win ||align=left| Alexandru Popescu || SUPERKOMBAT VIP Edition || Bucharest, Romania || Decision (unanimous) || 3 || 3:00 
|-  style="background:#cfc;"
| 2013-08-08 || Win ||align=left| Mika Tahitu || Slamm!! Soema Na Basi IV || Paramaribo, Suriname || Decision (unanimous) || 3 || 3:00 
|-  style="background:#cfc;"
| 2013-06-29 || Win ||align=left| Danny Hoving || Death Before Dishonor || Almere, Netherlands || KO (punches) || 1 || 
|-  style="background:#c5d2ea;"
| 2013-06-01 || Draw ||align=left| Christian Baya || Fight Fans V || Amsterdam, Netherlands || Decision Draw || 3 || 3:00  
|-  style="background:#cfc;"
| 2013-03-24 || Win ||align=left| Abder Bchrie || Haarlem Fight Night IV || Haarlem, Netherlands || Decision (unanimous) || 3 || 3:00    
|-  style="background:#cfc;"
| 2012-12-15 || Win ||align=left| Songkran Bamrungsri || K-1 World MAX 2012 World Championship Tournament Final || Athens, Greece || Decision (unanimous) || 3 || 3:00  
|-  style="background:#cfc;"
| 2012-11-03 || Win ||align=left| Merray Swedo || No Guts No Glory 6, Final || Hellevoetsluis, Netherlands || Decision (unanimous) || 3 || 3:00  
|-  style="background:#cfc;"
| 2012-11-03 || Win ||align=left| Kevin Miruka || No Guts No Glory 6, Semi Finals || Hellevoetsluis, Netherlands || Decision (unanimous) || 3 || 3:00   
|-  style="background:#cfc;"
| 2012-10-14 || Win ||align=left| Asqar Ghanbari Adivi || || Netherlands || KO || ||  
|-  style="background:#fbb;"
| 2012-06-03 || Loss ||align=left| Steve Poort || Fight Fans, Final || Amsterdam, Netherlands || KO (right high kick) || 1 || 
|-  style="background:#cfc;"
| 2012-06-03 || Win ||align=left| Ilias Hammouche || Fight Fans, Semi Finals || Amsterdam, Netherlands || KO ||  || 
|-  style="background:#cfc;"
| 2012-04-14 || Win ||align=left| Abdelmonim Mouyah || Bari Gym Event 2012 || Noordwijkerhout, Netherlands || || || 
|-  style="background:#cfc;"
| 2012-02-26 || Win ||align=left| Illias Tanouti || Next One || Nieuwegein, Netherlands || Decision (unanimous) || 3 || 3:00   
|-  style="background:#cfc;"
| 2011-10-09 || Win ||align=left| Luke Whelan || The Wolfpack || Oostzaan, Netherlands || ||  || 3:00    
|-
| colspan=9 | Legend:

See also 
List of K-1 events
List of male kickboxers

References

1993 births
Living people
Sportspeople from Paramaribo
Middleweight kickboxers
Surinamese male kickboxers
Surinamese emigrants to the Netherlands
Kunlun Fight kickboxers
Surinamese male mixed martial artists
SUPERKOMBAT kickboxers